TRNA (cytidine32/uridine32-2'-O)-methyltransferase (YfhQ, tRNA:Cm32/Um32 methyltransferase, TrMet(Xm32), TrmJ) is an enzyme with systematic name S-adenosyl-L-methionine:tRNA (cytidine32/uridine32-2'-O)-methyltransferase. This enzyme catalyses the following chemical reaction

(1) S-adenosyl-L-methionine + cytidine32 in tRNA  S-adenosyl-L-homocysteine + 2'-O-methylcytidine32 in tRNA
(2) S-adenosyl-L-methionine + uridine32 in tRNA  S-adenosyl-L-homocysteine + 2'-O-methyluridine32 in tRNA

In Escherichia coli YfhQ is the only methyltransferase responsible for the formation of 2'-O-methylcytidine32 in tRNA.

References

External links 

EC 2.1.1